A referendum on the territorial dispute with Guatemala was held in Belize on 8 May 2019. Voters were asked whether the territorial dispute with neighbouring Guatemala should be referred to the International Court of Justice.

The vote had originally been scheduled for 10 April but was delayed by a legal challenge. When it took place, the proposal was approved by 55% of voters.

Background
A commitment to take the Belizean–Guatemalan territorial dispute to the International Court of Justice was signed by the countries' governments in December 2008. A referendum was held in Guatemala on the proposal on 15 April 2018. As required by previous agreements, a referendum was required to be held in Belize within six months. Guatemalan Vice President Jafeth Cabrera stated that the Belizean vote would be held in May 2018, but the Belizean government released a statement denying the claim and stated that the referendum would be held after a voter re-registration process has occurred to ensure an accurate and fair vote.

Delay
The referendum was challenged in court by the opposition People's United Party (PUP) on the grounds that it was based on the 2008 Special Agreement between Belize and Guatemala, which might lead to territorial changes that were inconsistent with Belize's constitution. That led to an injunction being issued by the Supreme Court, delaying the referendum. Following the issuing of the injunction, the Belizean government introduced legislation that it believed would address the injunction. However, the PUP claimed that an amendment to the constitution, requiring a two-thirds majority vote, was needed before the referendum could be held. 

The Belizean government's new referendum legislation was passed by the House of Representatives on 12 April 2019, and by the Senate on 15 April. The PUP objected to the new referendum bill on the grounds that it was based on the 2008 Special Agreement, which was still the subject of the court proceedings under which the injunction delaying the referendum was issued. PUP attorney Kareem Musa stated that the PUP would have supported a referendum based on the pre-existing referendum legislation, which did reference the 2008 Special Agreement.

The European Union, the United Kingdom, and the United States issued a joint declaration, dated 11 April 2019, urging the Belizean government to hold a vote as soon as possible. Guatemalan president Jimmy Morales also urged the government to hold the referendum quickly. Meanwhile, Morales sparked controversy by drawing Belize as part of Guatemala during a visit to a school. On 15 April 2019, Guatemalan gunboats also prevented the Belizean coast guard from patrolling the Sarstoon River on the border between the two countries.

On 15 April 2019, the Belizean government asked for the injunction to be set aside in light of the 10 April deadline for holding the referendum and introducing a new referendum bill had passed. The court refused to set aside the injunction before the substantive hearing, and set the hearing for 29 April.

Results
The referendum passed by more than 10 percent of the vote nationwide. Yes won 22 of the constituencies, with nine voting no.

By district

See also
2018 Guatemalan territorial dispute referendum

References

Belizean territorial dispute referendum
Territorial dispute referendum
Belizean territorial dispute referendum
Referendums in Belize